Klingbach is a river of Hesse, Germany. It flows into the Kinzig in Bad Soden-Salmünster.

See also
List of rivers of Hesse

Rivers of Hesse
Rivers of the Spessart
Rivers of Germany